Metropolitan Nicodemus (secular name Nikolay Stepanovich Rusnak; 4 April 1921 – 15 September 2011) was the Ukrainian Orthodox metropolitan bishop of Kharkiv and Bohodukhiv.

He was born in 1921 in Davydivtsi, Chernivtsi. On 6 January 1945, he took monastic tonsure and was ordained three months later, on 29 April 1945.

He died at the Bishops' residence in the Holy Intercession Monastery, Kharkiv, on 15 September 2011.

References 

1921 births
2011 deaths
Metropolitan bishops of the Ukrainian Orthodox Church (Moscow Patriarchate)
Recipients of the Order of Prince Yaroslav the Wise, 2nd class
Recipients of the Honorary Diploma of the Cabinet of Ministers of Ukraine